Dorcas Shola Fapson is a Nigerian actress and presenter, known for her role as Sophie in MTV's Shuga. In 2020, she returned to the Shuga series as it dealt with coronavirus issues, with the actors doing the filming over several African countries.

Life 
Fapson was born in London in the 1990s. Her mother died when she was 14 and she completed her first degree in Criminology England. She then went on to study acting in New York.

She has appeared in series 3 of MTV Shuga as 'Sophie' and she was the presenter of "The Juice" an interview series for NdaniTV.

She was in series 3 MTV Shuga and she returned as medical expert "Sophie" when it went into a mini-series titled MTV Shuga Alone Together highlighting the problems of Coronavirus in 2020. The series was written by Tunde Aladese and broadcast for several nights - its backers include the United Nations. The series was based in Nigeria, South Africa, Kenya and Côte d'Ivoire and the story will progresses using on-line conversations between the characters. All of the filming was done by the actors who include Mohau Cele, Lerato Walaza, Sthandiwe Kgoroge, Uzoamaka Aniunoh, Mamarumo Marokane and Jemima Osunde.

Filmography

Film
Banana Island Ghost (2017)
My Wife & I  (2017)
The Essence (2019)
Man of God (2022)
The Perfect Arrangement (2022)

Television
Shuga (season 3): Shuga Naija (2013-2014, 2020)
Hustle (2016-2018)
Castle & Castle (2019-2021)

See also
List of Yoruba people

References

Living people
University of Lagos alumni
Yoruba women television personalities
21st-century Nigerian actresses
Actresses from London
Yoruba actresses
21st-century English women
21st-century English people
Nigerian film actresses
Nigerian television personalities
Nigerian television presenters
Year of birth missing (living people)